This is a discography of Al Di Meola, an American jazz fusion and Latin jazz guitarist, composer, and record producer of Italian origin.

Studio albums

Collaborative albums

Live albums

Other appearances

Video albums

References

External links
 Al Di Meola Official Web Site

Jazz discographies
Discographies of American artists